Karl Österreicher (3 January 1923 – 11 March 1995) was an Austrian conductor and music teacher.

Life 
Born in Rohrbach an der Gölsen, Lower Austria, Austrian studied clarinet as well as conducting with Hans Swarowsky, later also with Alfred Uhl and Clemens Krauss from 1946 at the then University of Music and Performing Arts Vienna with the Vienna Philharmonic clarinettist Leopold Wlach (1902-1956).

Österreicher served as director of the university orchestra of the University of Music from 1964, and from 1969 to 1992 he was also a professor at the University of Music and Performing Arts Vienna. His students include Alexis Agrafiotis, Tetsurō Ban, Eugen Brixel, Erke Duit, Carlos Kalmar, Jesus Lopez-Cobos, Michael Kapsner, Dmitri Kitayenko, Michael Lessky, Luis Antonio García Navarro, Matthias Manasi, Guido Mancusi, Luis Antonio García Navarro, Daniel Nazareth, Nikolaus Netzer, Arild Remmereit, René Staar, Alexander Steinitz, Nayden Todorov and Claudius Traunfellner.

His daughter from his marriage to the singer Sieglinde Wetzelsberger is the actress and director Isabella Gregor.

Austrian died in St. Pölten, (Lower Austria) at the age of 72.

Awards 
 1976: Großes Silbernes Decoration of Honour for Services to the Republic of Austria
 1978: 
 1981: Austrian Decoration for Science and Art I. Class
 1988:  in Gold

Further reading 
 Christian Fastl: Karl Österreicher. In ''Oesterreichisches Musiklexikon. Online edition, Vienna 2002 ff., ; Print edition: volume 4, Österreichischen Akademie der Wissenschaften press, Vienna 2005, .

References

External links 
 
 Karl_Österreicher on musiklexikon
 

Austrian conductors (music)
Austrian music educators
Academic staff of the University of Music and Performing Arts Vienna
Recipients of the Austrian Cross of Honour for Science and Art, 1st class
1923 births
1995 deaths
University of Music and Performing Arts Vienna alumni
People from Lilienfeld District